Czech nobility consists of the noble families from historical Czech lands, especially in their narrow sense, i.e. nobility of Bohemia proper, Moravia and Austrian Silesia – whether these families originated from those countries or moved into them through the centuries. These are connected with the history of Great Moravia, Duchy of Bohemia, later Kingdom of Bohemia, Margraviate of Moravia, the Duchies of Silesia and the Crown of Bohemia, the constitutional predecessor state of the modern-day Czech Republic.

Noble titles were abolished by law (No. 61/1918 Sb. z. a n.) in December 1918, shortly after the establishment of the independent Czechoslovak Republic. During the period of Nazism and communism, representatives of Czech noble families were often persecuted. After the Velvet Revolution in 1989, the property confiscated by the communists was returned to the nobility.

History 
The beginnings of the Czech nobility can be seen in the time of the first Přemyslid princes and kings, i.e. in the 9th century. As a legally defined state of nobility in the Czech lands, it arose in the course of the 13th century, when members of noble families began to own newly built stone castles. The influence of the nobility rose rapidly, which became the cause of a strained relationship between the king and the nobility during the last Přemyslid kings and especially during the reign of John of Bohemia and his grandson, Wenceslaus IV at the turn of the 14th and 15th centuries.
After the burning of Jan Hus in 1415, Czech society and therefore the Czech nobility was divided into two groups - Catholic and Hussite (later Protestant). Both groups were at war with each other both during the Hussite Wars and long after them. After the end of the Hussite Wars and the rule of the Luxembourgers in the 1530s, the country was controlled by various noble associations. In 1452, they agreed on a land administrator, who became the noble George of Poděbrady. Five years later he was elected King of Bohemia, but disputes between the Catholic and Protestant nobility continued until the outbreak of the Thirty Years' War in 1618. 

The status of the nobility further increased in 1500, when the Vladislav land constitution was issued. In 1526, Ferdinand I of Habsburg was elected King of Bohemia. He, along with his successors, tried to reduce the influence of the nobility. This process was interrupted during the reign of Rudolf II in the years 1576-1611. In 1618, the Protestant part of the Czech estates started the Bohemian Revolt by throwing imperial officials out of the windows of Prague Castle. Czech Protestants were defeated in the Battle of White Mountain in 1620, and the following year 27 leaders of this rebellion were executed. Thus, the Catholic aristocracy definitively won over the Protestant aristocracy in Bohemia, but at the same time the absolutist monarchy won over the estate monarchy.

During the Thirty Years' War after the Battle of White Mountain, a large part of the Protestant nobility had their property confiscated. Many new noble families came to the Czech lands at this time, originally usually from Germany, Italy, Spain, Austria or Scotland. Of the old Czech noble families, for example, the Kinsky, Sternberg, Kolowrat, Czernin, Lobkowitz, Pernštejn or Lichtenstein families remained in Bohemia, while the Eggenberg, Bucquoy, Colloredo-Mannsfeld, Gallas, Piccolomini, Schwarzenberg and others arrived.

From the 17th century, only the Catholic Czech nobility significantly participated in the functioning of the Habsburg Monarchy. Newly arrived families gradually identified with the Czech lands and often also with the Czech language. At the end of the 18th century, a period called Josephinism began. His representative, the Emperor and King Joseph II (1780-1790), initiated extensive reforms that significantly changed the position of the nobility and reduced the number of aristocratic privileges. Part of the modernization of the country was also the prioritization of German at the expense of Czech (the purpose was more efficient state administration).

During the 19th century, the Czech nobility was significantly involved in the process of national revival, the promotion of the Czech language and the emergence of modern Czech culture and society. Prominent representatives of the patriotic nobility were especially the Sternberg, Chotek, Schwarzenberg, Czernin, Kolowrat, Kinsky and Lobkowitz. In the second half of the 19th century, representatives of these and other families became involved in emerging parliamentary activity. The patriotically oriented nobles founded the Party of the Conservative Estate, cooperating with the Old Czech Party, another aristocratic political force was the Party of the Constitutionalist Estate. In the second half of the 19th century, the ranks of the Czech nobility were expanded by successful businessmen, politicians and artists, for example the Bartoň family, the founder of the Škoda Works Emil Škoda, the industrialist František Rienghoffer, the leader of the Old Czech Party František Ladislav Rieger, the composer Antonín Dvořák and the writer Jaroslav Vrchlický. The representatives of this so-called new nobility, however, usually remained outside the Czech aristocracy.

After the First World War, the monarchy disappeared in the Czech lands and a republic was established. Most of the Czech nobility held monarchist positions, but remained loyal to the newly established Czechoslovak Republic. Some nobles even entered the service of the Czechoslovak Republic and worked in diplomacy (for example, representatives of the Lobkowitz, Schwarzenberg and others). The Czechoslovak Republic confiscated the property of the Habsburgs and Hohenbergs, and the Clam-Martinic family also lost their property. During the following years, the property was sold off and the Fürstenbergs, for example, left the country. 

The turning point occurred in 1938. In response to the direct threat to the democratic state by Nazi Germany, the most important noble families issued a Declaration of the members of the old Czech families on the inviolability of the territory of the Czech state. During the audience with President Edvard Beneš, members of the Schwarzenberg, Lobkowitz, Kinsky, Kolowrat, Czernin, Sternberg, Colloredo-Mannsfeld, Parish, Dobrzenský, Strachwitz, and Belcredi publicly joined him. A similar statement was issued a year later, already in the occupied Protectorate of Bohemia and Moravia. In September 1939, the National Declaration of the Czech Nobility was drawn up, in which 85 of the most important Czech noblemen from 33 noble families declared their Czech nationality. The Nazis subsequently confiscated the property of these nobles, and some then lived through the war in house internment or in concentration camps. Some nobles managed to emigrate. Part of the nobles actively participated in the domestic resistance, for example the Bořek-Dohalský brothers were murdered in a concentration camp, Karel VI Schwarzenberg or Václav Norbert Kinský participated in the anti-Nazi uprising in 1945.

In 1945, the properties of most Czech noble families were returned. However, there was a deportation of the majority of the population of German nationality, in which both the nobles who collaborated with the Nazis and the nobles who did not collaborate with the Nazis, but only claimed German nationality before the war, lost their property. For example, Trauttmansdorff, Windischgrätz, Clam-Gallas, Thurn-Taxis, Desfours, or one branch of the Kinsky, Czernin and Rohan families had to leave the Czech lands. Due to the growing influence of the communists in Czechoslovakia in the years 1945 - 1948, the return of some property was also withheld (the Colloredo-Mannsfeld case), or the unjust confiscation of the primogeniture property of the Schwarzenberg family based on the Lex Schwarzenberg Act of 1947). The Liechtenstein family is still suing the Czech Republic for seized property, as well as several other families labeled as Germans after the war.

In 1948, there was a communist coup in Czechoslovakia. Subsequently, the property of all noble families was confiscated. A large part of the Czech nobility therefore emigrated (for example, the Schwarzenberg, Colloredo-Mannsfelds, Kolowrat, Hildprand, some Lobkowitz or Sternberg). The nobles who stayed at home (such as the Kinsky, Wratislav, Czernin, some Sternberg and Lobkowitz) were variously persecuted, for example they were prevented from studying, usually they were also evicted to unsuitable dwellings. Some members of the Czech nobility were imprisoned.

After the Velvet Revolution in 1989, properties seized by the communist regime were returned to their original owners. Members of the Czech nobility who emigrated abroad returned to their estates. Some subsequently returned to public life (for example, Karel Schwarzenberg as Minister of Foreign Affairs, Member of Parliament and Senator, Michal Lobkowitz as Minister of Defense and Member of Parliament, Tomáš Czernin as Senator). Other Czech nobles devote themselves, for example, to business, culture, science, the church, or knightly orders.

List of important noble families

 Bavor of Strakonice
 Belcredi
 Bibra
 Boskowicz
 Bořek-Dohalský
 Bruntálský of Vrbno
 Bubna of Litice
 Chorinský of Ledská
 Clary-Aldringen
 Colloredo-Mannsfeld
 Czernin
 Chotek
 Deym of Střítež
 Dobřenský of Dobřenice
 Dubá
 Berka of Dubá
 Jelení
 Hildprandt
 Harrach
 Hradec
 Hohenberg
 Kamenický of Kamenice
 Kinsky
 Colditz
 Kolowrat
 Kaunitz
 Krajíř of Krajek
 Kravaře
 Kunštát
 Lichtenburg
 Liechtenstein
 Lanna
 Larisch
 Lichnowsky
 Lipá
 Lobkowicz
 Martinic
 Nostitz
 Paar
 Parish
 Pernštejn
 Piccolomini
 Poděbrady
 Přemyslid
 Rohan
 Ronovci
 Rosenberg
 Švihovský of Rýzmberk
 Slavata of Chlum
 Slavník
 Smiřický of Smiřice
 Schlick
 Schwarzenberg
 Sporck
 Sternberg
 Schwamberg
 Thun-Hohenstein
 Trčka of Lípa
 Tunkl of Brníčko
 Vítkovci
 Vlašim
 Vršovci
 Waldstein
 Wratislaw of Mitrovice
 Zajíc of Hazmburk
 Zedtwitz
 Zierotin

Gallery

Notes

Further reading